Zimmermannia bosquella is a moth of the family Nepticulidae. It is found in Virginia, Ohio, and Kentucky in the United States. It is now classified as conspecific with the American chestnut moth, which was formerly considered as extinct.

Description
The wingspan is 9–10 mm. The larvae are full grown in October and early November, producing adults in May and June of the following year.

Behaviour and ecology
The larvae feed on Quercus palustris. They mine the leaves of their host plant. The larva forms a characteristic oval spiral mine in the bark of young branches of pin oak. The mine is a narrow linear track, closely coiled in a flattened oval spiral, resembling a watch spring. The empty egg shell often remains attached to the bark in the center of the mine after the larva has deserted the mine. The bark of old mines cracks and often breaks away entirely, leaving the inner bark exposed, producing scars which persist for a number of years.

The moth's synergistic relationship with the North American nut species led to a catastrophic population decline when almost all of the American chestnut trees fell victim to chestnut blight.  The American chestnut tree was driven almost to extinction, and the American chestnut moth was thought to be extinct. The American chestnut tree moth was later found to still be extant within populations of Zimmermannia bosquella.

External links
Nepticulidae of North America

References 

Nepticulidae
Moths of North America
Natural history of Kentucky
Natural history of Pennsylvania
Natural history of Virginia
Endemic fauna of the United States
Species endangered by disease
Taxobox binomials not recognized by IUCN
Moths described in 1878